The politics of Hainan Province in the People's Republic of China is structured in a dual party-government system like all other governing institutions in mainland China.

The Governor of Hainan is the highest-ranking official in the People's Government of Hainan. However, in the province's dual party-government governing system, the Governor has less power than the Hainan Chinese Communist Party Provincial Committee Secretary, colloquially termed the "Hainan CCP Party Chief".

List of the CCP Hainan committee secretaries
Xu Shijie: 1988–1990
Deng Hongxun: 1990–1993
Ruan Chongwu: 1993–1998
Du Qinglin: 1998–2001
Bai Keming: 2001–2002
Wang Qishan: 2002–2003
Wang Xiaofeng: 2003–2006
Wei Liucheng: 2006 – August 2011
Luo Baoming: August 2011 – April 2017
Liu Cigui: April 2017 – November 2020
Shen Xiaoming: December 2020 – present

List of governors of Hainan
Liang Xiang: 1988–1989
Liu Jianfeng: 1989–1993
Ruan Chongwu: 1993 – 1998
Wang Xiaofeng: 1998 – 2003
Wei Liucheng: 2003 – 2007
Luo Baoming: 2007 – August 2011
Jiang Dingzhi: August 2011 – January 2015
Liu Cigui: January 2015 – April 2017
Shen Xiaoming: April 2017 – December 2020
Feng Fei: December 2020 – present

List of chairmen of Hainan People's Congress
Xu Shijie: 1988–1992
Deng Hongxun: 1992–1993
Du Qinglin: 1993–2001
Bai Keming: 2001–2002
Wang Qishan: January 2003 – April 2003
Wang Xiaofeng: February 2004 – December 2006
Wei Liucheng: February 2007 – 2011
Luo Baoming: August 2011 – April 2017
Liu Cigui: April 2017 – November 2020
Shen Xiaoming: December 2020 – present

List of chairmen of CPPCC Hainan Committee
Yao Wenxu: 1988–1996
Chen Yuyi: 1996–2003
Wang Guangxian: 2003–2007
Zhong Wen: 2007 – 2011
Yu Xun: 2011 – 2018
Mao Wanchun: 2018-present

List of chairmen of the Hainan National Supervisory Commission
Lan Fo'an: 2018-2021
Chen Guomeng: 2021-present

Hainan
Hainan
Hainan